The  were an array of economic policies introduced between 1841 and 1843 by the Tokugawa shogunate in Japan. These reforms were efforts to resolve perceived problems in military, economic, agricultural, financial and religious systems.

The changes were intended to address problems in local politics, but they were also addressed more broadly to "domestic uneasiness." The perceived need for change led to the arrest of many prominent political figures and writers. The reforms became a precursor of reforms initiated after the Meiji Restoration two decades later.

The Tenpō Reforms were mostly instituted by Mizuno Tadakuni. Notably, the restrictions on entertainment were enforced solely by him and when he was removed from government in 1845, they ceased to be enforced. Besides this new coinage was issued and commodity price controls were lifted. Immigration to Edo was prohibited and the formation of societies as well as Rangaku (Dutch Learning) was banned.

An annual calendar ( nenjū gyōji) was set up during this period to bring order to Japanese society. Families were required to register themselves at the nearest Shinto shrine annually on the 16th of the first and seventh months. A Shinto festival (muramura jingi), meeting (jingi kasihū) or pilgrimage (muramura kamimōde) was scheduled once a month. The popular bon festival was rewritten as Sensosai, the Ancestor Festival, and was held twice a year. Buddhism was written out of this religious calendar, since the government revoked its support for existing Buddhist institutions.

This reform movement was related to three others during the Edo period: the Kyōhō reforms (1722–1730), the Kansei reforms (1787–1793) and the Keiō Reforms (1864–1867).

Chronology
The shogunate's interventions were only partly successful. Intervening factors like earthquakes, famine and other disasters exacerbated some of the conditions which the shōgun intended to ameliorate.
 July 20, 1835 (Tenpō 6, 14th day of the 6th month): Earthquake in Sanriku (Latitude: 37.900/Longitude:  141.900), 7.6 magnitude on the Richter Scale....Click link to NOAA/Japan: Significant Earthquake Database
 April 25, 1843 (Tenpō 14, 26th day of the 3rd month): Earthquake in Yezo, Kushiro, Nemuro (Latitude: 41.800/Longitude: 144.800), 8.4 magnitude on the Richter Scale.

Notes

References
 Hall, John Whitney and Marius Jansen. (1991).  Early Modern Japan: The Cambridge History of Japan. Cambridge: Cambridge University Press. ; OCLC 62064695
 Ketelaar, James Edward. (1990). Of Heretics and Martyrs in Meiji Japan: Buddhism and Its Persecution. Princeton: Princeton University Press. ;  OCLC 20996545
 Traugott, Mark. (1995). Repertoires and Cycles of Collective Action. Durham, North Carolina: Duke University Press. ; ;  OCLC 243809107

External links
 The Tenpo Reforms

1844 in Japan
Japanese governmental reforms
Rangaku